

References

 
Bolivia
Holidays